Hippolyte Peyrol (10 June 1856 – 24 December 1929) was a French sculptor. His work was part of the sculpture event in the art competition at the 1928 Summer Olympics.

References

External links
 

1856 births
1929 deaths
20th-century French sculptors
French male sculptors
Olympic competitors in art competitions
Sculptors from Paris